Oribatomyia is a genus of flies belonging to the family Lesser Dung flies.

Species
M. flaveola Richards, 1960
M. flavicans Richards, 1960

References

Sphaeroceridae
Diptera of Africa
Brachycera genera